Synura is a genus of colonial chrysomonad algae covered in silica scales. It is the most conspicuous genus of the order Synurales.

Classification
The present taxonomy recognizes five sections:
Section Peterseniae
S. americana
S. australiensis
S. borealis
S. conopea
S. glabra
S. heteropora
S. hibernica
S. laticarina
S. longisquama
S. macracantha
S. macropora
S. petersenii
Section Spinosae
S. curtispina
S. mollispina
S. nygaardii
S. sphagnicola
S. spinosa
Section Echinulatae
S. biseriata
S. echinulata
S. leptorrhabda
S. mammillosa
S. multidentata
Section Splendidae 
S. splendida
Section Uvellae
S. uvella

References

External links

Ochrophyta
Heterokont genera
Taxa named by Christian Gottfried Ehrenberg